is a children's platform game developed by Character Soft, a video game publishing subsidiary of Sanrio, for the Nintendo Family Computer. It was released on December 11, 1992 exclusively in Japan.

Gameplay

Players control Hello Kitty who must water all flowers in each stage. Hello Kitty must avoid animals and insects who block her way, though she can defend herself with the use of a large mallet. Money may be collected for the cash register, which adds to the player's score.

Running into enemies and allowing the time limit to expire will cause the player to lose a life. If the player loses all their lives it is game over and the score resets, though that is the only penalty as there are infinite continues.

There are 18 stages in total, with the second half of the game being more difficult than the first nine levels.

External links
Japanese-to-English title translation at SuperFamicom.org
Hello Kitty's Flower Garden at FC no Game Seiha Shimasho 

1992 video games
Character Soft games
Hello Kitty video games
Japan-exclusive video games
Nintendo Entertainment System games
Nintendo Entertainment System-only games
Platform games
Side-scrolling video games
Video games developed in Japan